The 1983 European Baseball Championship was held in Italy and was won by Italy. The Netherlands finished as runner-up.

Standings

References
(NL) European Championship Archive at honkbalsite

European Baseball Championship
European Baseball Championship
1983
1983 in Italian sport